The 1993–94 Detroit Red Wings season saw the Red Wings finish in first place in the Central Division with a record of 46 wins, 30 losses, and 8 ties for 100 points. They were eliminated in the first round of the playoffs by the San Jose Sharks in seven games.

Offseason

Regular season
The Red Wings led the NHL in goals (356), even-strength goals (249), short-handed goals (22) and shots on goal (2,990). Four Red Wings reached the 30-goal plateau and six reached the 70-point plateau. On Friday, February 11, 1994, the Red Wings scored three short-handed goals in a 6–3 win over the Philadelphia Flyers.

Final standings

Playoffs
The Red Wings, having finished 1st in the Western Conference and first in the NHL in scoring, were heavily favored to win in their first-round matchup against the eighth-seeded San Jose Sharks, who were making their first playoff appearance in franchise history. Despite outshooting San Jose 218–153 and outscoring them 27–21 in the series, the Red Wings were upset in seven games for the second consecutive playoff year; in Game 7, played on April 30, 1994, the Sharks edged the Wings 3–2 to advance to the second round.

Schedule and results

Player statistics

Regular season
Scoring

Goaltending

Playoffs
Scoring

Goaltending

Note: GP = Games played; G = Goals; A = Assists; Pts = Points; +/- = Plus-minus PIM = Penalty minutes; PPG = Power-play goals; SHG = Short-handed goals; GWG = Game-winning goals;
      MIN = Minutes played; W = Wins; L = Losses; T = Ties; GA = Goals against; GAA = Goals-against average;  SO = Shutouts; SA=Shots against; SV=Shots saved; SV% = Save percentage;

Awards and honors

Draft picks
Detroit's draft picks at the 1993 NHL Entry Draft held at the Quebec Coliseum in Quebec City, Quebec.

References
 Red Wings on Hockey Database

D
D
Detroit Red Wings seasons
Detroit Red Wings
Detroit Red Wings